Exilia hilgendorfi is a species of sea snail, a marine gastropod mollusk in the family Ptychatractidae.

Description
The length of the shell attains 90.5 mm.

Distribution
This marine species occurs off Madagascar; also off the east coast of Japan, from the Boso peninsula and Hachijo Island southwards (50–480 m depth) to the South China Sea (339–633 m depth) and the Solomon Islands (504–862 m depth).

References

 Yokoyama M. (1920). Fossils from the Miura Peninsula and its immediate north. Journal of the College of Science, Tokyo Imperial University. 39(6): 1–193, 20 pls.
 Kantor Yu.I., Bouchet P. & Oleinik A. 2001. A revision of the Recent species of Exilia, formerly Benthovoluta (Gastropoda: Turbinellidae). Ruthenica 11(2): 81–136.
 Spencer, H.G., Marshall, B.A. & Willan, R.C. (2009). Checklist of New Zealand living Mollusca. pp 196–219. in: Gordon, D.P. (ed.) New Zealand inventory of biodiversity. Volume one. Kingdom Animalia: Radiata, Lophotrochozoa, Deuterostomia. Canterbury University Press, Christchurch.

External links
 Martens E. von. (1897). Conchologische Miscellen II. Archiv für Naturgeschichte. 63(1): 157-180, pls 15-17
 Kantor Y.I., Puillandre N. & Bouchet P. (2020). The challenge of integrative taxonomy of rare, deep-water gastropods: the genus Exilia (Neogastropoda: Turbinelloidea: Ptychatractidae). Journal of Molluscan Studies. 86: 120-138

Ptychatractidae
Gastropods described in 1897